Codex Sangermanensis designated by Dabs1 or 0319 (in the numbering Gregory-Aland), α 1027 (Soden), is a tenth-century diglot manuscript, formerly in the library of  St. Germain des Prés, Paris, hence its name Sangermanensis, "of Saint Germanus". Now it is preserved in the Bibliothèque nationale, Number 11105 Fonds Latin. It contains the Pauline Epistles, lacking most of 1 Timothy and parts of Romans and Hebrews. It is particularly notable as one of the two such copies which display clear evidence of having had Claromontanus as exemplar (another is Uncial 0320). It is now part of the National Library of Russia (Gr. 20) collection in Saint Petersburg.

Description 

Because it is a diglot, Sangermanensis is also valuable for the study of the Latin bibles, namely the Vetus Latina.

It contains 177 parchment leaves of size . It is written in two columns per page, 31 lines per page. Codex Sangermanensis was composed in a coarse, large, thick hand.

The Greek text of the codex is a representative of the Western text-type. Kurt Aland (Aland's Profile 511 121/2 112 74S) placed it in Category II.

 Textual variants
 Romans 13:1 εξουσιαι for εξουσια
 Romans 15:14 αδελφοι μου

History 

The manuscript was written by Latin scribe, who was unfamiliar with Greek.

The manuscript was examined and described by Bernard de Montfaucon, Johann Jakob Wettstein, Giuseppe Bianchini, and Johann Jakob Griesbach, who designated it by siglum E. In 1805 it was collated by Matthaei.

The manuscript was held in the St. Germain des Prés at Paris. The St. Germain Library suffered severely during the French Revolution, and Peter Dubrovsky, Secretary to the Russian Embassy at Paris, acquired this manuscript together with many other manuscripts stolen from the ecclesiastical libraries.

See also 

 Sortable lists
 List of New Testament uncials
 List of New Testament Latin manuscripts
 Related articles
 Codex Claromontanus
 Textual criticism

References

Further reading 
 
 Bernard de Montfaucon, Paleographia Graeca (Paris, 1708), pp. 218–219.
 J. J. Wettstein, Prolegomena (1764, nos. 8, 9).
 G. Bianchini, Evangeliarum quadruplex II, pp. 591–592.
 J. J. Griesbach, Symbolae criticae II (Halle, 1793), pp. 75–77.

External links 
 New Testament Manuscripts: Uncials 
 INTF

Greek New Testament uncials
Vetus Latina New Testament manuscripts
9th-century biblical manuscripts
Codex Sangermanensis